Sergei Miroshnichenko may refer to:

 , Russian documentary filmmaker
 Sergei Miroshnichenko (ice hockey), Kazakhstani hockey player
 Sergei Miroshnichenko (football) Russian footballer